Tiruchendur was a Lok Sabha constituency in Tamil Nadu until 2008 constituency realignment.

Assembly segments
Before constituencies realignment of 2008, Tiruchendur Lok Sabha constituency used to be composed of the following assembly segments: 
Cheranmadevi
 Nanguneri
 Radhapuram
 Sathankulam
 Tiruchendur
Kanyakumari.

Members of the Parliament

 After 2008 constituency realignment, this seat ceased to exist.

Electorate 
In 2004, it had 10,31,362 of electorate, 4,95,753 men and  5,35,609 women.

Election results

General Election 2004

General Election 1999

General Election 1998

General Election 1996

General Election 1991

General Election 1989

By-election 1985

General Election 1984

General Election 1980

General Election 1977

General Election 1971

General Election 1967

General Election 1962

General Election 1957

See also
 Thiruchendur
 List of Constituencies of the Lok Sabha

References

External links
Election Commission of India

Former Lok Sabha constituencies of Tamil Nadu
Former constituencies of the Lok Sabha
2008 disestablishments in India
Constituencies disestablished in 2008